Hedi Zaiem, (born December 8, 1976 in Ras Jebel Bizerte), is a Tunisian media personality who came to prominence as a host on Radio Mosaïque FM and El Hiwar El Tounsi.

Biography 
It was at the age of 19 that he landed his first radio job as a host on his first radio show "Melomane", broadcast every Saturday evening (1999–2003).

After graduating from high school, Hedi Zaiem dreamed of obtaining a degree in journalism, but instead of realizing his dream, he changed direction and chose to continue his studies in law and political science.

Career

Radio career 
Starting in 2004 Hedi worked as an external collaborator on Mosaïque FM, this ended in November 2019.

Television career 
Zaiem hosted the show "Fekret Sami Fehri" on El Hiwar El Tounsi. He presented the show 90 ′ on El Hiwar El Tounsi.

References 

1976 births
Living people
People from Sfax
Tunisian television presenters
Tunisian radio presenters
Tunisian television producers